Dalian Maatsen (born 2 January 1994 in Vlaardingen) is a Dutch professional footballer who plays as a centre-back for AFC in the Tweede Divisie. He formerly played for NAC Breda and MVV Maastricht.

Personal
His brother is professional footballer Darren Maatsen.

References

External links
 Voetbal International profile 

1994 births
Living people
People from Vlaardingen
Dutch footballers
Dutch sportspeople of Surinamese descent
Association football central defenders
MVV Maastricht players
FC Den Bosch players
Vendsyssel FF players
Amsterdamsche FC players
Eerste Divisie players
Danish 1st Division players
Footballers from South Holland